David Arthur Gnohéré (born November 20, 1978) is a retired Ivorian professional footballer. His brother, Harlem, is also a footballer.

Career

Burnley 
Gnohéré's first taste of English football came at Lancashire club Burnley. After a successful trial period at the club, he signed a contract to be a part of Stan Ternent's squad in 2001. 'King Arthur', as he was effectively nicknamed, became a firm fans' favourite at the club with his dominant displays and his excellent runs up the field from defence.

His finest hour was in a local derby away at Preston North End. He stunned the Lilywhites with two goals, including one from a classy set up from Alan Moore. He was a constant fixture in the Burnley team during the 2001/2002 season, where Burnley looked likely to gain promotion to the Premier League.

Queens Park Rangers 
Gnohéré failed to live up to his early form at Burnley in the following seasons and was subsequently released when his contract expired. He joined Queens Park Rangers after an initial loan, but left the club at the end of the 2004/05 season. During his spell at QPR, he scored once in the Football League Trophy against Kidderminster Harriers.

Oxford United 
After a spell out of the game, Gnohéré signed for Oxford United in August 2007. However, after a string of poor performances for the U's and the return of regular defenders from injury, the club decided not to renew his month-to-month contract, and he was released in October 2007.

Notes

External links

1978 births
Living people
People from Yamoussoukro
Ivorian footballers
French footballers
Ivorian emigrants to France
Association football defenders
AS Cannes players
Stade Malherbe Caen players
Burnley F.C. players
Queens Park Rangers F.C. players
FC Istres players
Oxford United F.C. players